Le Châtellier is the name of two communes in France:
 Le Châtellier, Ille-et-Vilaine 
 Le Châtellier, Orne